Zhang Wansong (born April 1950) is a major general of China's People's Liberation Army Navy. He served as Director and Deputy Communist Party Secretary of the Joint Logistics Department of the Lanzhou Military Region. In August 2015, the PLA announced that he is under investigation for corruption.

Life and career
Zhang was born and brought up in Muce Township of Yiyang County, in Henan province. He joined the People’s Liberation Army in Xinjiang in 1968, that same year, he joined the Communist Party of China in December.

He served in various posts in Urumqi Military District and Xinjiang Military District before serving as Director and Deputy Communist Party Secretary of the Joint Logistics Department of Lanzhou Military Region.

On August 18, 2015, he was probed on suspicion of serious disciplinary violations by the Central Commission for Discipline Inspection of the Central Military Commission and has been transferred to the military procuratorates.

References

External links

1950 births
People's Liberation Army generals from Henan
Living people